Avenue d'Eylau is a two-way street in Paris' 16th arrondissement. It connects the Place du Trocadéro-et-du-11-Novembre and the Place de Mexico, 300 meters to the north-west. It is named after Napoleon's victory at the Battle of Eylau in 1807.

References 

Streets in the 16th arrondissement of Paris